The Anti-Taurus Mountains (from ) are a mountain range in southern and eastern Turkey, curving northeast from the Taurus Mountains. 

At , Mount Erciyes (Turkish: Erciyes Dağı) is the highest peak not just in the range but in central Anatolia as a whole. It is a massive stratovolcano located in the northern part of the Anti-Taurus. The ancient Greek geographer Strabo wrote that in his time the summit was never free of snow and that the few climbers who ascended it could see both the Black Sea and the Mediterranean.

Parts of the Anti-Taurus Mountains are protected within the Aladağlar National Park.

Notes

Mountain ranges of Turkey
Central Anatolia Region
Three-thousanders of Turkey